Tourism in Puerto Rico attracted 3.7 million visitors in 2019 and 1.0 million visitors in 2015, a notable increase from the average of 2010–2014 at 3.1 million. Tourism has been a very important source of revenue for Puerto Rico for a number of decades given it is host to diverse natural wonders, cultural and historical buildings, concerts and sporting events. Visitors from the United States do not need a passport to enter Puerto Rico and the ease of travel attracts many tourists from the mainland United States each year.

In 2017, Hurricane Maria caused severe damage to the island and its infrastructure. The damage was estimated at $100 billion. An April 2019 report indicated that by that time, only a few hotels were still closed, that life for tourists in and around the capital had, for the most part, returned to normal. By October 2019, nearly all of the popular amenities for tourists, in the major destinations such as San Juan, Ponce and Arecibo, were in operation on the island and tourism was rebounding. This was important for the economy, since tourism provides up 10% of Puerto Rico's GDP, according to Discover Puerto Rico.

History
The inauguration of the Condado Vanderbilt Hotel on 16 October 1919 marked the beginning of upscale tourism in Puerto Rico. According to Dennis Merrill, author of "Negotiating Cold War Paradise: U.S. Tourism, Economic Planning, and Cultural Modernity in Twentieth-Century Puerto Rico", the tourism industry in the Caribbean is viewed by its critics as causing host countries to practice economic subservience to the visitors of the islands. He highlights the U.S. attempt in the 1930s to make Puerto Rico an island destination for tourists to bring in a new source of revenue to the U.S. and help lift it out of economic depression. Travel guides and advertisements used at the time suggested that the people of Puerto Rico lived in poverty and wanted a chance to serve travelers from the United States.

The creation of the Caribe Hilton Hotel in San Juan in 1949 represented a partnership between the Puerto Rican government and U.S business. Americans viewed the creation of the hotel as a symbol of their power to create material progress. A majority of Puerto Rican citizens did not approve of the decision to build the hotel. They believed that the public funds would have better suited the island inhabitants if they were invested in improving education and social welfare. San Juan's fire chief of the time disapproved the government's decision to "degrade itself by buying tourists." Articles published by El Mundo in 1952 saw the American tourists as selfish people who did not care about the island and ones who will in the future convince the Puerto Rican people to serve them. In the 1950s, Old San Juan was restored by the Puerto Rican government in order to attract American visitors interested in the history of the island.

The tourism industry experienced moderate levels of growth in 2014, driven primarily by the introduction of new cruise lines and airfare activity and the development of new hotels on the island. Nonstop flights to Puerto Rico from Frankfurt, Madrid, Bogota, Chicago, Atlanta, Miami, Houston, Los Angeles, Philadelphia, and New York are currently available. New direct routes from Europe and Latin America were in the works by 2014.

Competition
Cuba and Puerto Rico have perennially competed for the top tourist destination in the Caribbean. Puerto Rico's tourism has been helped by poor U.S. relations with Cuba. In 2015, the U.S. reestablished diplomatic relations with Cuba and loosened the travel restrictions for Americans. This decision boosted Cuban tourism and surpassed Puerto Rico for total visitors, but in 2017, the U.S. government planned to re-enforce travel restrictions to Cuba. Puerto Rico also competes with the Dominican Republic, Aruba, Jamaica and Florida for American and international visitors. Tourists going to Saint Barthélemy catch a connecting flight from Puerto Rico.

Marketing campaigns

The Puerto Rico Tourism Company spent $1 million in 2002, featuring celebrities, to advertise the tourism to Puerto Rico. In 2017, Despacito, a wildly popular song by two Puerto Rican artists caused a spike in tourism to Puerto Rico, especially to an area of San Juan called La Perla, featured in the song's video.

On July 1, 2018, Puerto Rico's government passed a law to create a new tourism organization, Discover Puerto Rico. This was part of a larger plan to use tourism to revitalize the island after Hurricane Maria.

The new Discover Puerto Rico campaign started that month. An April 2019 report stated that the tourism team "after hitting the one-year anniversary of the storm in September [2018], the organization began to shift towards more optimistic messaging. The "Have We Met Yet?" campaign was intended to highlight the island's culture and history, making it distinct, different than other Caribbean destinations. In 2019, Discover Puerto Rico planned to continue that campaign, including "streaming options for branded content".

The video series "Discover Puerto Rico with Lin-Manuel" starring actor, songwriter and lyricist Lin-Manuel Miranda, became available on all JetBlue aircraft on 1 October 1, 2019 and would continue until 30 January 2020.

Destinations
Tourist destinations vary around the island.
Located on the northwestern part of the island are Aguadilla, where the old Ramey Air Force Base is located; Arecibo, famous for its observatory; and Rincón, favored for its surf.

In 2015 Puerto Rico had 19 casinos, mainly located in San Juan.

Bayamón has its Parque de las Ciencias (Science Park). Cabo Rojo is famous for its beautiful beaches. Cataño has the Bacardi factory, the world's largest rum distillery.

Fajardo has the Fajardo Lighthouse and a luminicent bay, Las Croabas fishing village, the Paso Fino horse national competition ring, and the Seven Seas beach. On the northeastern side, beaches in Luquillo include Balneario La Monserrate, Playa Azul, and La Pared and La Selva, where leatherback turtles often nest.

In the southwest are Mayagüez, home of the Dr. Juan A. Rivero Zoo and the local beer, Medalla brewery; and Ponce with its 19th century historic district. There are over 1,046 restored buildings, plus the world-renowned Museo de Arte de Ponce, the imposing Castillo Serrallés, the nostalgic Hacienda Buena Vista coffee plantation, and its whimsical Parque de Bombas firehouse in Ponce.

San Juan has Old San Juan, with its cobble-stone streets and small alleys, the Puerto Rican Museum of Art, and the El Morro Castle, an old fortress. Near San Juan is El Yunque National Forest, the only tropical rain forest in the U.S. with 30,000 acres—a place to hike and see waterfalls. During the 2019 government shutdown, San Juan's two colonial-era fortresses—Castillo San Felipe del Morro and Castillo San Cristóbal—were closed to visitors. However, since the end of the shutdown on January 25, 2019, they have since been reopened.

Trujillo Alto is home to Lake Carraizo Dam. Two smaller Puerto Rican islands are Culebra island, with its solitary beaches such as Flamenco Beach is another popular destination spot; and Vieques with many beaches, two Spanish castles and lighthouses, eye-catching mountains and sought-after marine reefs.

Puerto Rico is considered one of the best places in the world to catch Atlantic tarpon.

The gambling sector is also an important contributor to the tourism sector (employing 3,409 people, 2017 ), and it encompasses 20 casinos all attached to hotels and resorts acting as tourist destinations. This is mandatory, according to Laws of Puerto Rico, casinos must be attached to hotels and resorts, and must be located within “zonas históricas, antiguas o de interés turístico” – historically important zones of tourism. There is a significant and growing Chinese presence in the Puerto Rico gambling sector, so far 10% of the casinos are owned by Chinese individuals or companies, and more are partially owned. And the number of Chinese tourists is also on the rise. In 2019, contribution of travel and tourism to GDP (% of GDP) for Puerto Rico was 6.9%. However, the exact contribution of the gambling sector within the tourism and travel sector is not measured separately by the government.

Cruise ship tourism
In spite of damage caused by previous hurricanes, particularly Maria in 2017, an April 2019 report stated that "1.7 million cruise ship passengers are expected to visit this fiscal year".

In late November 2019 however, reports indicated that 90 calls to San Juan by Royal Caribbean ships would be cancelled during 2020 and 2021. This step would mean 360,000 fewer visitors, with a loss to the island's economy of 44 million. As well, 30 ship departures from San Juan were being canceled. The rationale for this decision was discussed in a news report:The reason for the cancellations is the privatization of the cruise docks in San Juan due to much-needed maintenance that is needed. Around $250 million investment is needed to make sure cruise ships can continue to dock there in the years to come. There is an urge for governor Wanda Vazquez to not go ahead with the privatization so this news is fluid.

Airports

Culebra Airport, Island of Culebra
Eugenio María de Hostos Airport, Mayagüez
Fernando Luis Ribas Dominicci Airport, San Juan
Humacao Airport, Humacao
Luis Muñoz Marín International Airport, San Juan
Mercedita Airport, Ponce
Rafael Hernández Airport, Aguadilla

The Antonio Rivera Rodríguez Airport on the island of Vieques serves visitors and locals to and from Vieques. It is a one-runway, primary commercial service airport.

Land Privatization, Ownership, and Impacts

The Role of Corporations

Increasing land privatization in Puerto Rico takes place amid what scholars Yarimar Bonilla and Marisol LeBrón term “aftershocks of disaster,”  where the island is mired in (neo)colonial debt and public infrastructures like airports and hospitals continue to be sold to the highest bidder. The passing of Act 20/22 in 2012 also allowed wealthy elites from the United States to treat Puerto Rico as a tax haven and become “stakeholders.” New arrivals–who do not include those born in Puerto Rico—who spend at least six months in the territory can be exempt from federal, local, capital gains, and passive income taxes until 2035, all of which contributes to the rise of “hyper-segregated elite foreign enclaves around the island.”

As Naomi Klein and Boniila demonstrate in their research, this “infrastructure of disposition and displacement” was deeply rooted even before Hurricane Maria in 2017. Hurricane Maria only worsened the ongoing land privatization, as one resident shared: “It feels like Hurricane Maria placed a ‘For Sale’ sign on the island.” More recently, in 2021, cryptocurrency companies like Pantera Capital and Redwood City Ventures have been moving their offices to Puerto Rico alongside 274 other corporations, LLCs, partnerships, and other entities approved under the Exports Services Act to avoid taxes. Mortgage investors, such as Goldman Sachs Group Inc., Perella Weinberg Partners, and TPG Capital have increasingly turned to Puerto Rico for cheap foreclosed properties as local residents are forced to leave. There is such significant demand that other companies, such as PRelocate, specialize in helping their clients relocate their businesses to the island.

Land Ownership Shifts and Tourism

The lack of proof of ownership of land and homes in Puerto Rico has served as an obstacle for people whose homes were destroyed by Hurricane Maria in 2017 to get repaired. According to the Puerto Rico Builders’ Association, in 2018, 45-55% of homes and commercial buildings have been constructed without building permits or following land use codes. It is estimated that 260,000 homes do not have deeds or titles. Much of these illegally built homes have been cited as examples of “rescuing land.” Many who lack the resources would thereby “rescue land” by building homes in vacant and unused land that is often owned by the state, and not homeowners. In addition, many homes lack historical documentation because of the practice of subdividing generationally owned land. As a result, much of the housing that has been made inhospitable by the Hurricane that devastated the island, cannot be fixed for residents through FEMA funding, leaving many in dire and unsafe conditions, or without proper housing at all.

Meanwhile, in July 2019 the Puerto Rican state planning board put forth new land use codes in an attempt to bring business to the island and alleviate the debt crisis. The plan, which was met with significant resistance,would potentially change areas that were zoned as natural resource areas, agricultural lands, and residential areas to allow new land uses. According to Puerto Rican farmer Carlos Pacheo, land used for agricultural areas allowing new uses, including industry, can negatively affect the growth of local agriculture in Puerto Rico and thus impact food security, which is a growing problem for Puerto Rico as the island has been relying on expensive importation of food. It is estimated that 99,000 cuerdas of land could lose protected status, making land once deemed as natural resources or residential areas, could fall into the ownership of corporations, especially tourist corporations.

Moreover, the Puerto Rican government has been incentivizing the growth of the Tourism Industry and investors from the United States, instead of addressing the lack of ownership of land and stable housing by regular citizens and long-time Puerto Rican residents. Act 74 specifically incentivizes investment in the tourism industry. Under the act, construction of new facilities or remodeling of old facilities for the use of tourism would grant land developers a 10 year tax exemption. Businesses providing tourist activity can be defined as timeshares, hotels, inns, guesthouses, entertainment facilities in ports that stimulate tourism, theme parks, golf courses associated with a hotel, and marinas for tourist purposes. It also includes businesses that administer or develop natural resources as a source of active and passive entertainment. In addition, Act 74 grants businesses excise, sales and use tax exemptions on imported articles to be used for Tourism Activity in Puerto Rico provided that there was a genuine effort to source the articles in Puerto Rico but there was no economic justification to do so. Moreover, businesses that provide tourist activity receive property tax exemption at the 90% rate, income tax exemption at the 90% rate if not located in Vieques or Culebra, income tax exemption at the 100% rate if located in Vieques or Culebra, and exemption from municipal construction tax, amongst other benefits for investors. There is thereby less public investment from the growth of private developments in the tourist industry.

Additionally, the 2012 Act 60 provides tax benefits for foreigners who relocate and buy property in Puerto Rico within 2 years of moving. 4,286 applications for these benefits have been approved since 2012. Puerto Rican residents do not qualify for these benefits, resulting in more and more land being owned by non-Puerto Ricans. According to the New York Times, many of these investors buy residential properties and turn them into short-term rentals, causing a housing shortage for local residents. In Rincon, a 2-bedroom apartment would list for $290,000 in 2017 on average, but would now cost $420,000. This is as forty-three percent of Puerto Ricans live under the poverty level, meaning owning housing is increasingly accessible only to the wealthy, who, in many instances, are foreign investors.

British property investor, Keith St. Clair, who benefitted from tax-breaks that incentivize property ownership by tourist corporations, aims to: “ignite a much-needed renaissance that will increase tourism” in the Isla Verde section of Puerto Rico.

In 2019, Donald Trump’s tax incentive plan resulted in 98% of Puerto Rico being deemed as an “Opportunity Zone,” which would incentivize land development by foreign investors in areas deemed as low-income based on the Census. Pedro Cardona, former vice president and a planner for the Puerto Rican Planning Board says that the instatement of “Opportunity Zones” would introduce a gentrification and elitization component to various areas in Puerto Rico, which can be tied to foreign investment in the Tourism industry.

Grassroots Movements/Protests

There are numerous ongoing grassroots movements and protests against land privatization in PR, particularly against the expansion of many resorts and hotels onto public beaches.

Los Almendros Beach

In 2021, protests broke out in Rincón, PR, when the Board of Directors of the luxury condominiums Sol y Playa began plans to develop a pool that would spill over onto the neighboring public beach, Los Almendros beach. Environmentalists and locals protested the development, as it would have caused a significant disruption to the wildlife and ecosystem around the beach. Locals also noted that Sol y Playa had no right to build onto a public beach, and were concerned that it was the start of an attempt to privatize the beach to renters in condominiums.

Controversy erupted when large numbers of police began to remove and arrest the protestors, despite the beach being fully public. The heavy police presence confirmed for many native Puerto Ricans the hypocrisy of policing in PR; many protestors noted how police often dedicate resources when wealthy neighborhoods (like Sol y Playa) become disrupted, yet in the rest of the island, police presence is sparse. In total, around 534 police stood ground at the protest site.

The protest, however, was extremely effective; the governor’s planning board declared Sol y Playa’s construction project illegal on August 4, 2021. This ruling was seen as a potential turning point in the fight against the privatization of public land in Puerto Rico.

Playas P’al Pueblo 

Playas P’al Pueblo is one organization fighting against the hotel chain Marriott in Puerto Rico. They were founded on March 13, 2005, with the intention of setting up a basecamp in the near the Courtyard Marriott hotel in La Isla Verde, to protest the Marriott’s proposed expansion in the area.

Since the founding of Playas P’al Pueblo, the organization has been litigating on behalf of environmental justice groups to stop the proposed expansion. They regard the Marriott’s expansion in La Isla Verde, as well as similar resort and hotel expansion across PR, as an attempt to privatize public land and exclude native Puerto Ricans from their own land.

Playas P’al Pueblo has also been involved in numerous coastal restoration projects, as well as environmental education projects in their base-camp. They have begun to plant trees around their base-camp in order to re-establish a coastabl habitat, as developers had nearly destroyed it. They have also hosted hundreds of students at their base camp to teach them about the ongoing resistance against the privatization of Puerto Rican land.

Playas P’al Pueblo’s efforts to rebuild the coastal habitat have led to locals calling the area “Carolina’s Forrest Coastal Reserve.”

Gallery

See also
 List of Puerto Rico landmarks
 Public holidays in Puerto Rico
Tourism in San Juan, Puerto Rico
 Tourism in the United States

References

Bibliography

External links

 Puerto Rico Tourism Board YouTube channel

 
Economy of Puerto Rico
Puerto Rico